The Sarasaviya Best Director Award is presented annually by the weekly Sarasaviya newspaper in collaboration with the Associated Newspapers of Ceylon Limited as part of the Sarasaviya Awards Festival. It was first given in 1964.

Following is a partial list of the winners of this prestigious title since then.

References

Director
Awards established in 1964
1964 establishments in Ceylon